Fernando Vicente was the defending champion but lost in the first round to Mariano Zabaleta.

Guillermo Cañas won in the final 7–5, 6–2 against Tommy Robredo.

Seeds

  Fernando Vicente (first round)
  Mariano Puerta (first round)
  Rainer Schüttler (first round)
  Andreas Vinciguerra (first round)
  Álex Calatrava (second round)
  Younes El Aynaoui (semifinals)
  Arnaud di Pasquale (first round)
  Marc Rosset (withdrew)

Draw

Finals

Top half

Bottom half

External links
 2001 Grand Prix Hassan II Draw

Singles
- Singles, 2001 Grand Prix Hassan Ii